Girolamo Muzio or Mutio Justinopolitano (1496 in Padua, Republic of Venice 1576 in Barberino Val d'Elsa, Grand Duchy of Tuscany) was an Italian  author in defence of the vernacular Italian language against Latin.

Biography 
Girolamo Muzio was born at Padua in 1496, and educated there. He was honoured by Pope Leo X with the title of Cavalier; and he was in the service of the marquis del Vasto; after whose death he passed into the service of Don Ferdinando Gonzaga, whose affairs he managed at several Italian courts. The duke of Urbino next appointed him governor to his son, afterwards duke Francesco II. He was afterwards in the service of cardinal Ferdinando de' Medici. He died in 1576. In 1551 he published, along with other Italian poems, his Arte Poetica, in three books, composed in blank verse. Besides letters, histories, moral treatises, he wrote several tracts against the Reformers, especially those of the Italian nation, who at that time were numerous. He first attacked Vergerio. He then contended with Ochino, and Betti; and he afterwards assailed Bullinger, Viret, and others. As a counterbalance to the Protestant writers of ecclesiastical history, called the Magdeburg Centuriators, Muzio, in 1570, published a Roman Catholic history of the two first centuries, which made up in polemic zeal for what it wanted in sound erudition.

Works
 Il duello (Venice, 1550)
 Il gentilhuomo (Venice, 1571)
 Battaglie per diffesa dell'italica lingua (1582)
 Poems for Tullia d’Aragona: Egloghe (1550)
 Treatise of poetry after Horace (1551)
 Against Claudio Tolomei (1533–1574)
 
 Le mentite ochiniane (1551) against Bernardino Ochino
 Lettere catholiche, vol I-IV (1571)

Notes

External links
 

1496 births
1576 deaths
Italian poets
Italian male poets
Italian philologists
Italian Renaissance humanists
People from Padua
Italian Roman Catholic writers